Abdul Aziz Kurd (1904–1979) was a co-founder of the Anjuman-e-Ittehad-e-Balochan-wa-Balochistan. Among the pioneering Baloch nationalists, he wished to establish an independent Balochistan.

Kurd was born to a civil servant to the Khanate of Kalat and was among the handful of Balochs to receive an education. Baloch nationalists allege that he established an underground movement — Young Baloch — in the 1920s, for the initiation of representative democracy in the Khanate, borrowing from the Young Turk Revolution. Martin Axmann finds such claims to lack relevant archival evidence and suspicious in light of Kurd's young age but nonetheless plausible in an atmosphere rife with anti-imperialism.

Sometime around 1930, Kurd co-founded the Anjuman-e-Ittehad-e-Balochan-wa-Balochistan (AIBB) with Yousaf Aziz Magsi, a dissident against the Khanate as well as British government. AIBB infused political sentiment in the region and remained a force of significance to the extent of being often parried by the Khanate during times of successional disputes but it failed to achieve its original objectives of ensuring a representative democracy. Nonetheless, that it had sought for the administrative unification of Balochistan and greater autonomy in no uncertain terms, Kurd underwent multiple imprisonments by the British Government alongside other leaders. In June 1935, after Maqsi's death, Kurd became the chief of AIBB.

About two years later, in February 1935, Kurd split to form the Kalat State National Party (KSNP), preferring to advocate for outright independence than bargain with the British for incremental reforms. The Khanate, promising to introduce administrative reforms, was accepted as an ally and Kurd was even appointed to the rank of a cabinet minister in Ahmad Yar Khan's court. In his new role, Kurd aided Khan to repress rebellions by the tributary states of Jam and Las Bela. However, that Khan declined to facilitate the more radical of reforms centered on democratic principles, Kurd resigned in February 1939. KSNP was banned a few months later, for conspiring against the Khanate and Kurd had to shift bases to Quetta.

Across the 1940s, Kurd remained opposed not only to Jinnah's demand of a united homeland for South Asian Muslims but also merger with India, unlike most of KSNP leaders.

Notes

References

Pakistani politicians
People from Balochistan, Pakistan
Baloch people
Baloch nationalists
Kurdish people
1904 births
1979 deaths